JTI - Japan Tobacco International is the international tobacco division of Japan Tobacco, a leading international tobacco product manufacturer. The holding company is JT International SA and headquartered in Geneva, Switzerland, and sells its brands in 120 countries.

As of 2018, JTI employed around 40,000 people around the world at 400 offices, 27 factories, five research and development centers, and five tobacco-processing facilities.

Eddy Pirard is the president and CEO, and Koji Shimayoshi is the deputy CEO and executive vice president for business development and corporate strategy.

History 
JTI was formed in 1999, when Japan Tobacco Inc. purchased the international tobacco operations of the US multinational R.J. Reynolds for $ 7.8 billion.

In 2007, Gallaher Group, a FTSE 100 business, was acquired by Japan Tobacco Inc. for GBP 9.4 billion. At the time, this was the largest foreign acquisition by a Japanese company.

In 2009, the JT Group acquired part of the worldwide business of Tribac Leaf Limited (a company that trades tobacco in Africa), as well as two Brazilian companies active in the tobacco business, Kannenberg and KBH&C. In the same year, the JT Group also set up JTI Leaf Services, a joint venture with two leaf suppliers in the US – Hail & Cotton Inc. and JEB International.

Canadian class action lawsuit
The three largest Canadian tobacco companies, Imperial Tobacco Canada, JTI-Macdonald Corp, and Rothmans Benson & Hedges, are the subject of the largest class-action lawsuit in Canadian history. The case started 12 March 2012 in Quebec Superior Court, and the companies face a potential payout of C$27 billion (US $20.18 billion) in damages and penalties. In addition, a number of Canadian provinces are teaming up to sue tobacco companies to recover healthcare costs caused by smoking.

On 1 June 2015, Québec Superior Court Justice Brian Riordan awarded more than $15 billion to Quebec smokers in a landmark case that pitted them against three Canadian cigarette giants, including JTI-Macdonald Corp. JTI was ordered to pay 13% of the total, or C$2bn. The company stated, "JTI-Macdonald Corp. fundamentally disagrees with today’s judgment and intends to file an appeal.". "The company strongly believes that the evidence presented at trial does not justify the court’s conclusions." The plaintiffs in the court case stated that even if an appeal were lodged, the companies were required to pay C$1bn within 60 days.

Patron of the University of Latvia 
Japan Tobacco International is a silver patron of the University of Latvia Foundation. It has supported the university since 2010 by donating to long-term projects of the University of Latvia Senior Association.

Brands

Flagship brands
These brands account for 72% of JTI's sales:

 Benson & Hedges
 Camel (outside the US)
 Glamour
 LD
 Mevius (Mild Seven)
 Natural American Spirit (outside the US)
 Silk Cut
 Sobranie
 Winston (outside the US)

Other tobacco products
 Hamlet 
 Old Holborn 
 Amber Leaf 
 Gustavus Snus
 Wings

Other brands
JTI also has a portfolio of cigarette brands that the company markets regionally, including Export in Canada.

References

External links
Official website

Japan Tobacco
Tobacco companies of Switzerland
Manufacturing companies established in 1999
Multinational companies headquartered in Switzerland
Manufacturing companies based in Geneva
1999 establishments in Switzerland
Tobacco companies